Carini is an Italian surname. Notable people with the surname include:

Antonio Carini (1872–1950), Italian physician, bacteriologist, and professor
Fabián Carini (born 1979), Uruguayan footballer
Piero Carini (1921–1957), Italian racing driver

Italian-language surnames